The 2009 Six Nations Under 20s Championship was a rugby union competition held between February and March 2009. France won the tournament but no team won the Grand Slam or Triple Crown.

Final Table

Results

Round one

Round two

Round three

Round four

Round five

Top try-scorers
Doumayrou (FRA), Trinder, Lowe (both ENG), Venditti (ITA) - 3 tries

Lapandry, Camara, Fall (all FRA), Phillips, Tipuric, Reynolds (all WAL) - 2 tries

References

2009
2009 rugby union tournaments for national teams
2008–09 in English rugby union
2008–09 in French rugby union
2008–09 in Irish rugby union
2008–09 in Welsh rugby union
2008–09 in Scottish rugby union
2008–09 in Italian rugby union
U-20
February 2009 sports events in Europe
March 2009 sports events in Europe